A referendum on reintroducing multi-party democracy was held in Malawi on 14 June 1993. Over 64% of voters voted to end the Malawi Congress Party's 31-year monopoly on power. Soon afterwards President Hastings Banda, leader since independence, was stripped of both his post of President for life and most of the dictatorial powers he had held since the institution of one-party rule in 1966. General elections were held the following year, in which Banda was defeated. Voter turnout for the referendum was 67% of the 4.7 million registered voters.

Results

References

External links
Detailed results by district African Elections Database

Malawi
1993 in Malawi
Referendums in Malawi
June 1993 events in Africa
Democratization